Frenuloplasty is the surgical alteration of a frenulum when its presence restricts range of motion between interconnected tissues.  Two of the common sites for a frenuloplasty are:

 Frenuloplasty of tongue
 Frenuloplasty of prepuce of penis

Surgical procedures and techniques